Fredrik Hultén (9 November 1966 – 13 June 1997) was a Swedish rower. He competed at the 1988 Summer Olympics, 1992 Summer Olympics and the 1996 Summer Olympics.

References

1966 births
1997 deaths
Swedish male rowers
Olympic rowers of Sweden
Rowers at the 1988 Summer Olympics
Rowers at the 1992 Summer Olympics
Rowers at the 1996 Summer Olympics
Sportspeople from Lund